Observer (also known as Brain Guy) is a fictional character in the Mystery Science Theater 3000 television series. He is played by Bill Corbett, and appears in the eighth through eleventh seasons of the series.

Observer is a hyperintelligent, psychic alien from a planet of fellow aliens who confusingly all share the name "Observer" (the other two who appear in the series are played by Michael J. Nelson and Paul Chaplin). Supposedly, the Observers "evolved" beyond bodies into dark-green brains, contained in large Petri dishes (not unlike the Providers in the Star Trek episode "The Gamesters of Triskelion"). They are carried around by humanoid host bodies (controllable over a distance of up to 50 yards), rendering their abandonment of their original bodies rather pointless. (As the robot Gypsy points out, "Wouldn't it be more convenient to just keep your brains in your heads?") Thus Observer is, technically, only the brain which is being carried by the host body, but for all intents and purposes, he is considered a humanoid with brain separated from body. Observer joins the mad scientists ("The Mads") after his planet is accidentally destroyed by Mike Nelson.

Like his colleagues Professor Bobo (Kevin Murphy) and Pearl Forrester (Mary Jo Pehl), Brain Guy is deeply dysfunctional. Unlike Bobo and Pearl, Brain Guy apparently has a considerable social and sexual life once the Mads returns to Earth in Seasons 9 and 10. He is also said to have, as Professor Bobo put it, "B.O." (body odor). Observer denies this, claiming that he doesn't have a body, although eventually he gives himself a sniff and admits that he does, in fact, stink.

After Observer joins the Mads, he usually ends up being the one who sends the movies to the Satellite of Love via his psychic abilities.

Observer, like his fellow Observers, claims to be omnipotent and omniscient, much like Q and his people from Star Trek: The Next Generation, but frequently fails to demonstrate these supposed abilities (he once stated that he was "not that omnipotent"). In one of his early appearances (Episode #806, The Undead), before his homeworld is accidentally destroyed by Mike Nelson, his fellow Observers test the rest of the cast to see if any of them deserve the right to become part of their kind. He is surprised when Tom Servo scores higher than him, leading to Observer being painfully punished.

Exposure to Pearl's autocratic manner appears to further degrade his powers over the course of the show, to the point that when Observer tries to punish Mike horribly, he only sends him a necktie. ("Don't you see what a terrible gift that is?") In the final episode, #1013, Danger: Diabolik, Pearl's playful dousing of his brain in Mountain Dew temporarily interferes with his speech and disables his gifts, allowing the Satellite of Love to crash to Earth.

As the Mads pack up their things before leaving Castle Forrester, the Forrester family's ancestral home, Observer initially agrees with Pearl that he must have "lots of stuff goin’ on" after they go their separate ways, but finally admits that he'll probably "have to take that position as the all-knowing eternal and universal consciousness over on Rylos 14".

External links

Mystery Science Theater 3000 characters
Television characters introduced in 1997
Male characters in television